Li Shuang may refer to:
 Li Shuang (artist) (born 1957), Chinese contemporary artist
 Li Shuang (badminton), Chinese-Turkish badminton player
 Li Shuang (field hockey) (born 1978), Chinese field hockey player
 Li Shuang (snowboarder) (born 1992), Chinese snowboarder